The men's 4 x 400 metres relay event at the 2005 European Athletics U23 Championships was held in Erfurt, Germany, at Steigerwaldstadion on 16 and 17 July.

Medalists

Results

Final
17 July

Heats
16 July
Qualified: first 3 in each heat and 2 best to the Final

Heat 1

Heat 2

Participation
According to an unofficial count, 55 athletes from 12 countries participated in the event.

 (4)
 (4)
 (5)
 (4)
 (5)
 (6)
 (4)
 (5)
 (4)
 (4)
 (4)
 (6)

References

4 x 400 metres relay
Relays at the European Athletics U23 Championships